Mauricio Antonio Robles (born March 5, 1989), is a Venezuelan former professional baseball pitcher, who played in Major League Baseball (MLB) for the Philadelphia Phillies. He was signed as a non-drafted free agent by the Detroit Tigers on April 1, 2006. Robles pitched for Venezuela at the 2013 World Baseball Classic.

Robles had a basic fastball, curveball, changeup combination. He was described as having a good arm with a good fastball and developing secondary pitches. While Robles’ fastball was clocked as high as 97 mph, his changeup was perhaps his best pitch and was described as a plus offering by peers and coaches.

Baseball career

He was second in the VSL, with six losses, finished third with 83 strikeouts, and tied for fifth with 14 games started.

Detroit Tigers
In , Robles went 5-3, with a 2.66 earned run average (ERA), in 23 appearances, including 16 starts, for the Minor League Baseball (MiLB) Class A full-season West Michigan Whitecaps, of the Midwest League. For the month of July, he ranked ninth in the league, with a 1.55 ERA, in five starts.

Seattle Mariners
After beginning the season by playing at two levels of A Ball for the Tigers, Robles was traded on July 31, 2009, to the Seattle Mariners, along with fellow pitcher Luke French, for veteran pitcher Jarrod Washburn. For the remainder of that Summer, he pitched for the Class A+ High Desert Mavericks, of the California League.

Philadelphia Phillies
On December 14, 2012, the Philadelphia Phillies claimed Robles off waivers, from Seattle. After progressing quickly through the Phillies’ Double-A and Triple-A farm teams, they promoted him to the major leagues, on September 3, 2013. Robles was sent outright to the Triple-A International League (IL) Lehigh Valley IronPigs, on October 3, 2013; he then declared his free agency, on November 4, 2013.

Chicago White Sox
Robles signed a minor league deal with the Chicago White Sox on November 24, 2013, that included an invitation to spring training. He spent the  season with the IL’s Triple-A Charlotte Knights. Robles again became a free agent, following the season.

Bridgeport Bluefish
On April 5, 2016, Robles signed with the Bridgeport Bluefish of the Atlantic League of Professional Baseball. He became a free agent after the  season.

See also
 List of Major League Baseball players from Venezuela

References

External links

Mauricio Robles at Pura Pelota (Venezuelan Professional Baseball League)

1989 births
Living people
Cardenales de Lara players
High Desert Mavericks players
Jackson Generals (Southern League) players
Lakeland Flying Tigers players
Lehigh Valley IronPigs players
Leones del Caracas players
Major League Baseball pitchers
Major League Baseball players from Venezuela
Philadelphia Phillies players
Reading Fightin Phils players
Sportspeople from Valencia, Venezuela
Tacoma Rainiers players
Tiburones de La Guaira players
Venezuelan expatriate baseball players in the United States
Venezuelan Summer League Tigers players
Venezuelan Summer League Tigers/Marlins players
West Michigan Whitecaps players
West Tennessee Diamond Jaxx players
World Baseball Classic players of Venezuela
2013 World Baseball Classic players